Airampoa corrugata is a species of Airampoa found in Argentina.

References

External links

corrugata
Flora of Argentina
Cacti of South America